Pterostylis curta, commonly known as the blunt greenhood, is a species of orchid found in south-eastern Australia, Lord Howe Island and New Caledonia. It has a rosette of leaves at its base and a single white and green, forward leaning flower with a brown tip and a twisted labellum.

Description
The leaves are dark green, have a distinct petiole and sometimes a wavy edge. The dorsal sepal and petals are fused to form a hood or "galea" over the column. The dorsal sepal and petals are a similar length and end in a blunt tip. There is a wide gap at each side of the flower between the petals and lateral sepals. Flowering occurs from July to October.

Taxonomy and naming
Pterostylis curta was first described in 1810 by Robert Brown and the description was published in Prodromus Florae Novae Hollandiae et Insulae Van Diemen.

Distribution and habitat
The blunt greenhood is widespread and common in Queensland, New South Wales, Victoria and Tasmania, growing in moist places in heath, scrub, woodland and forest. It also occurs on Lord Howe Island and in New Caledonia but is rare in South Australia.

Use in horticulture
Pterostylis curta has received the Royal Horticultural Society's Award of Garden Merit. It is easily grown in pots containing a free-draining, sandy mix. The plants require regular watering during their growing period, to be kept dry during dormancy and to be repotted annually.

References

curta
Orchids of the Australian Capital Territory
Orchids of New South Wales
Orchids of Oceania
Orchids of Queensland
Orchids of South Australia
Orchids of Tasmania
Orchids of Victoria (Australia)
Plants described in 1810